Pedobacter cryoconitis is a species of bacteria. It is facultatively psychrophilic, Gram-negative, aerobic and rod-shaped strain, having been first isolated from alpine glacier cryoconite. It is also non-flagellated and non-spore-forming, with type strain A37T (=DSM 14825T =LMG 21415T).

References

Further reading

External links

LPSN
ScienceDaily article
Type strain of Pedobacter cryoconitis at BacDive -  the Bacterial Diversity Metadatabase

Sphingobacteriia
Bacteria described in 2003